Records of prime ministers of Hungary from 1848  to the present.

Period of service 

The prime minister with the longest single term was Count Kálmán Tisza, lasting 14 years and 144 days from 20 October 1875 until 13 March 1890. The longest-serving prime minister is incumbent office-holder Viktor Orbán, who held the position from 6 July 1998 to 27 May 2002 and from 29 May 2010 until present-day. He surpassed Kálmán Tisza as the longest-serving prime minister on 30 November 2020.

The shortest period in office is more confused, depending on the criteria.

The shortest ever period was only 17 hours, a record held by Count János Hadik, from 30 October to 31 October 1918, who was asked to form a government by King Charles IV but the Aster Revolution broke out led by leftist liberal Count Mihály Károlyi, who founded the Hungarian Democratic Republic. By the end of the day, King Charles IV had accepted the coup and appointed Károlyi as Hungary's new prime minister. Hadik had no time to form a government, so many historians believe he was just a designated premier.

In August 1919 Gyula Peidl was appointed Prime Minister in the last days of the Hungarian Soviet Republic. After six days on August 6, 1919, his government was overthrown by a rightist armed coup led by István Friedrich. Peidl went into exile in Austria.

Other notables 

The prime minister with the longest period between the start of his first appointment and the end of his final term was Sándor Wekerle, whose first term began on 17 November 1892 and his third and final term ended on 30 October 1918 (nearly 26 years).

Count Pál Teleki holds the record for the longest period between terms—his first term ended on 14 April 1921 and his second term did not start until 16 February 1939.

Number of terms 

A prime minister's "term" is traditionally regarded as the period between their appointment and resignation (or dismissal), with the number of general elections taking place in the intervening period making no difference.

The only prime minister to serve three non-consecutive terms was Sándor Wekerle (17 November 1892 – 14 January 1895, 8 April 1906 – 17 January 1910, 20 August 1917 – 30 October 1918).

Age at appointment 

The youngest prime minister to be appointed was András Hegedüs on 18 April 1955 at the age of 32 years, 5 months and 18 days. The second youngest was Viktor Orbán on 8 July 1998 at the age of 35 years, 1 month and 7 days.

The oldest prime minister to be appointed was Baron Géza Fejérváry on 18 June 1905 at the age of 72 years, 3 months and 3 days.

Age on leaving office 

The youngest prime minister to leave office was András Hegedüs, who left the country during the Hungarian Revolution of 1956, aged 34.

Longest lived

On 1 March 2020 he surpassed Lajos Kossuth's record, who was born on 19 September 1802 and who died on 20 March 1894 at the age of 91 years, 6 months and 3 days. Of the five former prime ministers currently alive, the oldest is Péter Boross, consequently.

Dezső Pattantyús-Ábrahám, the prime minister of the third Counter-Revolutionary Government during the Hungarian Soviet Republic died on 25 July 1973, at the age of 98 years and 15 days.

Shortest lived 

The shortest-lived prime minister was the first ever prime minister, Count Lajos Batthyány, who was born on 10 February 1807 and was executed on 6 October 1849 at the age of 42 years.

Longest lived after office 

The prime minister who lived the longest after leaving office was Lajos Kossuth, who left office on 1 May 1849 and died on 20 March 1894, a total of 44 years, 10 months and 19 days.

In recent years, the prime minister who lived the longest after leaving office was András Hegedüs, whose term ended on 24 October 1956; he died on 23 October 1999, 42 years, 11 months and 29 days later.

Shortest lived after office 

The prime minister who lived the shortest period after leaving office (excluding those who died in office) was Ferenc Szálasi, whose term ended on 28 March 1945. He was executed on 12 March 1946, less than a year later.

Lajos Batthyány resigned on 2 October 1848. After the defeat of Hungarian Revolution of 1848 he was executed 1 year and 4 days later, on 6 October 1849.

The shortest lived after office premier who died in natural causes was Kálmán Darányi. He left the office on 14 May 1938 and died on 1 November 1939.

Died in office 

Three prime ministers have died in office:

 Gyula Gömbös, who died on 6 October 1936 (testicular cancer).
 Pál Teleki, who died on 3 April 1941 (suicide).
 József Antall, who died on 12 December 1993 (tumor).

Executed prime ministers 

Six prime ministers were executed; all of them after leaving office.

 Lajos Batthyány, executed on 6 October 1849.
 László Bárdossy, executed on 10 January 1946.
 Béla Imrédy, executed on 28 February 1946.
 Ferenc Szálasi, executed on 12 March 1946.
 Döme Sztójay, executed on 22 August 1946.
 Imre Nagy, executed on 16 June 1958.

Assassinated prime ministers 

 István Tisza is the only prime minister in this category. He was assassinated after leaving office.

See also 
 List of prime ministers of Hungary by tenure